Mariko Yashida is a fictional character appearing in American comic books published by Marvel Comics. The character has been depicted as Wolverine's romantic interest.

She was portrayed by Tao Okamoto in the 2013 film The Wolverine.

Publication history
Created by Chris Claremont and John Byrne, the character first appeared in Uncanny X-Men #118 (Feb 1979). In an interview published in Back Issue! magazine #4, Byrne claims Mariko was based on Lady Toda Mariko, a character in the 1975 novel Shōgun: "I had just read Shogun, which Chris had not read at that point. I just absolutely wanted to steal that character, just shamelessly steal the character. And as you probably know, she was created to die.”

Fictional character biography
Mariko was the daughter of Shingen Yashida, the half-sister of Kenuichio Harada, and cousin of Sunfire and Sunpyre and the aunt of Shingen "Shin" Harada.

She first met the X-Men when they returned from a sojourn in the Savage Land and were asked to help Japan, which was being blackmailed by the terrorist Moses Magnum. At that time, she encountered Wolverine in a private moment, which developed into a mutual attraction. Afterward, Mariko would frequently visit the United States to see Wolverine.

Some time later, however, Mariko was married by Shingen to Yakuza gang leader Noburu-Hideki to solidify her father's connections to the Japanese underworld, and was subjected to brutal domestic abuse by her husband. She was later used by him to maneuver Wolverine into participating in an assassination of a rival by having the superhero inadvertently provide a distraction while protecting his true love/girlfriend from the rival's own assassins. This also had the intended effect of deepening Mariko's disgust for Logan upon witnessing Logan going berserk in battle. However, Mariko soon realized that her father was evil and was shaming her family with sinister schemes. To stop Shingen, Mariko planned to kill her father and then commit seppuku in recompense, but Logan, learning the truth about this manipulation and inspired by a personal epiphany about humanity, attacked and slew her father in a fair battle of honor before she could act. In doing so, Logan was convinced that Mariko would be honorbound to kill him for that and was prepared to die at her hands rather than harm her in self-defense. However, Mariko explained her opinion of her father and presented the family katana to Logan as a token of her approval as an honorable warrior who is properly entitled to it.

Upon her father's death, she became head (Oyabun) of the Yakuza crime family Clan Yashida.

Mariko happily became Logan's fiancée, but their wedding was halted by the supervillain Mastermind who used a mind control device to change Mariko's mind. When the control was lifted, Wolverine and Mariko resumed their romantic relationship after a period of separation, but have not reconsidered marriage. Mariko also refused any closer engagement with Logan until she had dealt with her father's criminal legacy, which she felt honor-bound to rectify.

The X-Men returned from the first Secret Wars and, accidentally ending up in Japan, fighting a dragon their companion Lockheed had brought along. During the chaos, the young girl Amiko Kobayashi loses her mother when a collapsing building crushes her. Dying, the woman begs Wolverine to take care of her daughter. Since Wolverine could not take care of the girl himself, Wolverine chose to place Amiko in Mariko's care, whom the girl soon adopted as a surrogate mother. Amiko and Mariko were at one point targeted by Ogun (one of Wolverine's old enemies), but the attack was averted by Wolverine and Kitty Pryde.

Mariko was poisoned with tetrodotoxin from a blowfish by the assassin Reiko in the employ of her rival Matsu'o Tsurayaba. She asked Wolverine to kill her to avoid a painful death and preserve her honor. Wolverine killed her and vowed to avenge Mariko by yearly severing parts of Matsu'o's body on the anniversary of her death.

Phaedra, an agent of the Hand, resurrected Shingen and stole a piece of Wolverine's soul to torture. Wolverine made a deal with Azrael (the Angel of Death) to kill Phaedra to stop resurrecting the dead if Azrael would heal Wolverine's soul. Phaedra attempted to convince Wolverine to spare her by offering to resurrect Mariko, but Wolverine refused. Wolverine stated that he would pay any price to bring Mariko back, but Logan deeply loved Mariko because she was a better person than himself in every way, and he knew that Mariko would never accept life if it meant that someone as evil as Phaedra was allowed to live as well.

Many years later, Wolverine was captured by the Devil and taken to Hell. In order to have Wolverine comply with his demands, the lord of Hell had Mariko's soul (who had been condemned to Hell for her leadership of the Yashida clan's criminal activities) brought to torture Wolverine into submission; Wolverine, however, was eventually rescued by Puck and Thomas Logan. When Logan finally prepared to flee Hell, he intended to take Mariko alongside but (feeling remorse) she asked to be left behind and return to Earth and reclaim his own life, a request Logan reluctantly acquiesced to.

Old Man Logan faced off against the Hand during their Regenix operation, facing their latest member called the Scarlet Samurai. Logan later discovered that Scarlet Samurai is Mariko resurrected by the Hand to serve as their weapon. With help from Logan, nanites were used to free Mariko from the Hand's control while Gorgon got away. When Logan prepared to return to his own time, he asked Mariko to keep an eye on the young girl would have been in his wife in his own timeline, feeling that asking the other X-Men to keep an eye on her would have risked bringing her too close to his own life, whereas Mariko understood the consequences of loving Logan and would be able to keep the girl safe while keeping her distant.

Other versions

Age of Apocalypse
In the "Age of Apocalypse" timeline, Mariko Yashida was a member of the Human High Council, a group of humans that opposed Apocalypse's tyrannical rule. While not engaged to Logan, Mariko was his former lover and she birthed a daughter, Kirika, an amalgam of X-23 and Amiko Kobayashi. Mariko participates in an attempt to bomb forces of Apocalypse based in North America, though she knows this would mean extensive civilian deaths.

Exiles

In an alternate universe (Earth-2109), Mariko Yashida was Sunfire and a member of the Exiles from Exiles #2 (September, 2001) until her death in Exiles #37 (January, 2004) of their ongoing series. In the 2109 alternate universe, she had the same powers as her 616 Marvel Universe counterpart Sunfire and Sunpyre. This version was created by Judd Winick and Mike McKone. A Japanese citizen and a member of the X-Men in her reality, she was one of Marvel's few openly homosexual characters. She has a relationship with one reality's version of Spider-Woman (Mary Jane Watson).

Reception
Sunfire's open homosexuality has attracted some interest after coming out in Exiles #11. Her death has also garnered some attention. Perry Moore includes her as an example of the poor treatment of gay superheroes, paralleling the earlier Women in Refrigerators.

Judd Winick has been accused of pursuing some broader social agenda, making Sunfire gay being one of his ideas used to support this notion, as he explains in an interview with Comic Book Resources:

What If?
In the What If story "If Wolverine Had Married Mariko", their marriage is not hindered by Mastermind, and Wolverine becomes head of the Shingen clan. However, they soon have to contend with the Yakuza, all united by the Kingpin. Although they appear to prevail with the aid of the Silver Samurai and Sunfire, Mariko is eventually assassinated by the Silver Samurai himself, who had turned traitor, leaving Wolverine to return to the X-Men.

Wolverine Noir
Mariko Yashida appears in Wolverine Noir as a businesswoman looking to expand her father's interests into New York City.

Wolverine MAX
Mariko Yashida appears in Wolverine MAX as a member of the Yashida clan during the early 1900s. She met and fell in love with Logan, but their relationship ended after he killed her father. In the present, Logan is shown in a relationship with a woman named Yami Yashida, until she is killed in a plane crash. She is also much older in this continuity having been born in the 1860s but died sometime in the 1910s.

In other media

Television
 Mariko Yashida appears in Wolverine and the X-Men, voiced by Gwendoline Yeo. This depiction is Wolverine's former sweetheart/lover and Kenuichio Harada's reluctant wife. She strongly fell romantically in love with Logan, despite her father wanting her to marry Harada due to Yakuza connections. In the episode "Code of Conduct", Mariko is at the Japanese Embassy looking for her power-hungry husband when Silver Samurai had abducted the X-Men. She's present at the recent duel between Logan and Silver Samurai. After Harada acted dishonorably (using mutant abilities when not allowed) which annulled the duel and was taken away for dishonoring the Yakuza clan who agreed to release the X-Men, Mariko told Logan that her husband will be driven from the Yakuza in shame and will not be admitted again. When she's asked why she had chosen Harada over Logan, she said that her father and the Yakuza would have killed them both had she not chosen Harada, awaiting her decision with drawn swords. She said that marrying Harada was the only honorable thing she could do, even if it meant keeping her and Logan forever apart from one another. Mariko and Logan then went their separate ways.
 Mariko Yashida appears in Marvel Anime: Wolverine, voiced by Fumiko Orikasa in the Japanese dub and reprised by Gwendoline Yeo in the English dub. This version is arranged by Shingen Yashida to be married to Madripoor's current leader Hideki Kurohagi. Logan spends the entire series on a quest to free her from this engagement so they can be together again. In the twelfth and last episode, Mariko is accidentally shot in the chest by Hideki but not before confessing the strong and enduring romantic feelings she has always had for Logan, assuring Logan that she will always be together in spirit as she peacefully dies in Logan's arms.

Film
Mariko Yashida appears as a major character in the 2013 film The Wolverine, portrayed by Tao Okamoto. This version is Ichirō Yashida's granddaughter, Shingen Yashida's daughter, Yukio's foster sister and Logan's love interest. At her grandfather's funeral, she is kidnapped by the Yakuza crime syndicate but saved by Logan. As they hide in Yashida's house, they start to fall for each other. Mariko is kidnapped and taken to Yashida Corporation's headquarters where it's revealed that her father was the one who ordered the Yakuza to kidnap and ultimately assassinate her because Ichirō had left the family empire to her instead of Shingen. She is saved by Kenuichio Harada with the Black Ninja clan and taken to a research center based where Ichirō was born. When it's revealed that Ichirō's alive and used Mariko as bait to capture and extract Wolverine's immortality using a robotic adamantium armor, she manages to free Wolverine by directing the machine Wolverine is in into the sword strike, breaking her grandfather's focus and freeing Wolverine. Mariko also hits Ichirō with Wolverine's discarded claws, allowing Wolverine to finish her grandfather off. Later Mariko is Yashida Corporation's new CEO and says goodbye to Logan, hoping to see him again.

References

External links
 The Women of Marvel Comics Mariko Page
 Sunfire (Earth–2109) Marvel Comics Database entry
 Sunfire (Earth–2109) Marvel Comics biography
 Sunfire (Earth–2109) Marvel Directory
 Sunfire (Earth–2109) at Reality Check: The Exiles Resource Center
 UncannyXmen.net Character Profile On Mariko Yashida

Characters created by Chris Claremont
Characters created by Judd Winick
Comics characters introduced in 1979
Fictional Japanese people
Fictional Shintoists
Fictional yakuza
Characters created by John Byrne (comics)
Wolverine (comics) characters
Marvel Comics female superheroes
Marvel Comics LGBT superheroes
X-Men supporting characters